This list of museums in Boston, Massachusetts is a list of museums (including nonprofit organizations, government entities, and private businesses) that collect and care for objects of cultural, artistic, scientific, or historical interest and make their collections or related exhibits available for public viewing. Museums that exist only in cyberspace are not included. Also included are non-profit and university art galleries.

Museums

Defunct museums
 Boston Marine Museum
 Boston Museum (theatre)
 The Boston Museum
 Chinese Museum (Boston)
 Columbian Museum
 The Computer Museum, Boston
 Linnaean Society of New England
 Market Museum (Boston)
 New England Museum of Natural History
 New-England Museum (Boston)

See also 
 List of museums in Massachusetts
 Franklin Park Zoo
 New England Aquarium
 Sites of interest in Boston

References 
 City of Boston: Museums & Gallery Spaces

 
Museums
Boston
museums